Farm to Market Road 734 (FM 734) is a  farm-to-market road in Travis and Williamson counties in the U.S. state of Texas. It is the state-maintained portion of Parmer Lane, a major arterial road in the region. Most of the route's length is located just within the northern city limits of Austin, with portions located in Cedar Park, Leander, and unincorporated areas.

Route description 
The southern terminus of FM 734 is at US 290, just west of Manor in Travis County. It travels northwest to intersect with Interstate 35 (I-35). It continues to Loop 1 and crosses SH 45 and RM 620 in northwest Austin before reaching its northern terminus at RM 1431 in Cedar Park. The roadway continues beyond RM 1431 as Ronald W. Reagan Boulevard, which travels northward into Leander before curving eastward back to I-35 within the southern city limits of Jarrell.

For most of its length, FM 734 is a six-lane divided roadway. West of Loop 1, the road has wide shoulders and is relatively lightly developed, making it attractive as a bicycling route. However, FM 734 does carry a high traffic load during rush hours, especially at Loop 1 and I-35. FM 734 is primarily a four-lane road between US 290 and Yager Lane, east of I-35.

On June 27, 1995, FM 734 was redesignated Urban Road 734 (UR 734). The designation reverted to FM 734 with the elimination of the Urban Road system on November 15, 2018.

Except for the section between Loop 1 and I-35, Parmer Lane is designated a scenic roadway by the City of Austin.

History

Previous route

Current route
Parmer Lane between Loop 275 (Lamar Boulevard) and Loop 1 (Mopac Boulevard) was first designated as FM 734 on April 25, 1978. It extended north to RM 620 on April 23, 1981. The current termini of FM 734 were set on October 24, 1985, when the northern terminus was moved from RM 620 to RM 1431, and on May 16, 1988, when the southern terminus was moved from Loop 275 to US 290.

In 1997, FM 734 was improved east of I-35 to accommodate a new Samsung Electronics chip fabrication facility. Other major developments along FM 734 include a Freescale Semiconductor office complex built south of RM 620 in 1999, the Round Rock ISD Athletic Complex built between RM 620 and RM 1431 in 2003 and the Tech Ridge shopping center, which opened at I-35 in 2003.

Junction list

References

0734
Transportation in Austin, Texas
Cedar Park, Texas
Transportation in Williamson County, Texas
Transportation in Travis County, Texas